Grevillea phanerophlebia, commonly known as the prominent vein grevillea and the vein leaf grevillea, is a species of flowering plant in the family Proteaceae and is endemic to a restricted part of the south-west of Western Australia. It is an erect, spreading or straggly shrub with divided leaves, the lobes linear, and white and cream-coloured to yellow flowers.

Description
Grevillea phanerophlebia is an erect, spreading or straggly shrub that typically grows to a height of  its branchlets moderately hairy. The lower surface of the leaves is sparsely hairy.

Taxonomy
Grevillea phanerophlebia was first formally described in 1904 by Ludwig Diels in Ernst Georg Pritzel's Botanische Jahrbücher für Systematik, Pflanzengeschichte und Pflanzengeographie from specimens he collected near Mingenew. The specific epithet (phanerophlebia) means "visible or obvious veins".

Distribution and habitat
Prominent vein grevillea grows in scrub or heath on sandplain and has been recorded near Mingenew, Mullewa and Eradu in the Avon Wheatbelt and Geraldton Sandplains bioregions. It grows in association with Waitzia nitida, Acacia saligna, Acacia acuminata, Allocasuarina campestris, Hakea erinacea, Mesomelaena sp., Austrostipa elegantissima, Aristida holathera, Bonamia rosea, Grevillea amplexans and Grevillea biternata.

Conservation status
This grevillea is listed as "Threatened" by the Western Australian Government Department of Biodiversity, Conservation and Attractions, meaning that it is in danger of extinction. In 2001, an "interim recovery plan" was prepared for the species. The main threats to the species were listed as poor regeneration, weed invasion, rail maintenance activities, inappropriate fire regimes, chemical drift, drought, grazing by rabbits, and recreation activities. At that time, the only known surviving population was near Mingenew, and was thought to contain only juvenile plants.

Use in horticulture
Despite being rare in the wild, this grevillea has been in cultivation since the 1980s in New South Wales and Victoria. G. phanerophlebia is commercially available and sold as a waterwise informal hedge, barrier or border plant that can be grown in areas with hot overhead sun suitable in dry soils and able to tolerate light frost.

See also
 List of Grevillea species

References

phanerophlebia
Proteales of Australia
Eudicots of Western Australia
Taxa named by Ludwig Diels
Plants described in 1904